The 2020–21 Charlotte 49ers women's basketball team represented University of North Carolina at Charlotte during the 2020–21 NCAA Division I women's basketball season. The team was led by tenth-year head coach Cara Consuegra, and played their home games at the Dale F. Halton Arena in Charlotte, North Carolina as a member of Conference USA.

Schedule and results

|-
!colspan=12 style=|Non-conference regular season

|-
!colspan=12 style=|CUSA regular season

|-
!colspan=12 style=| CUSA Tournament

|-
!colspan=12 style=| WNIT

See also
 2020–21 Charlotte 49ers men's basketball team

Notes

References

Charlotte 49ers women's basketball seasons
Charlotte 49ers
Charlotte 49ers women's basketball team
Charlotte 49ers women's basketball team